Walter Bressan (born 26 January 1981) is a former Italian professional footballer who played as a goalkeeper.

Playing career 
After starting his career as part of the Atalanta youth system, Bressan subsequently moved to the lower leagues, playing at Serie B level for Arezzo, Grosseto, Sassuolo and Varese. In 2014 he moved to then-Serie A club Cesena as a backup goalkeeper, making his Serie A debut in the club's final 2014–15 Serie A league game, a 0–5 loss to Torino. He retired in 2017 after two seasons at Chievo with no first team appearances.

Coaching career 
In 2017 Bressan joined Chievo as a goalkeeping coach under Rolando Maran. He left Chievo in 2018 to join Cagliari's youth system coaching staff, being subsequently promoted to first team duties the following year.

In 2020 he followed Maran at Genoa.

In July 2021 he returned to Cagliari as a goalkeeping coach under first team manager Leonardo Semplici, being confirmed also as part of the coaching staff of successors Walter Mazzarri and Alessandro Agostini. He was successively confirmed on his role also for the 2022–23 season, under new head coach Fabio Liverani.

References 

1981 births
Living people
Italian footballers
Association football goalkeepers
Italy youth international footballers
Serie A players
Serie B players
Atalanta B.C. players
Spezia Calcio players
Treviso F.B.C. 1993 players
F.C. Pavia players
S.S. Arezzo players
F.C. Grosseto S.S.D. players
U.S. Sassuolo Calcio players
A.C. Cesena players
S.S.D. Varese Calcio players
A.C. ChievoVerona players
People from Oderzo
Sportspeople from the Province of Treviso
Footballers from Veneto